Stężyca may refer to the following places:
Stężyca, Greater Poland Voivodeship (west-central Poland)
Stężyca, Lublin Voivodeship (east Poland)
Stężyca, Pomeranian Voivodeship (north Poland)